Chartres is a city in Eure-et-Loir, France. Chartres may also refer to:

Places
Chartres Cathedral, Chartres, Eure-et-Loir, France
Chartres, Falkland Islands, a settlement on West Falkland

Ships
, a train ferry in service 1973-93

People with the name
John Chartres, British historian
Richard Chartres (born 1947), British former bishop and life peer
Vivien Chartres (1893-1941), British violinist and child prodigy
Mademoiselle de Chartres (disambiguation), a title given to a daughter of the King of France

See also
Siege of Chartres (disambiguation) - Chartres has been besieged more than once